Francisco Mwepu (born 29 February 2000) is a Zambian professional footballer who plays as a forward for Sturm Graz.

Career
In 2018, Mwepu trialed for Red Bull Salzburg.

In 2020, he signed for Austrian Bundesliga club Sturm Graz.

Career statistics

Personal life

His older brother, Enock, was a professional footballer before retiring due to health issues and played for Brighton & Hove Albion in the Premier League.

References

External links
 

Living people
2000 births
Zambian footballers
Association football forwards
Austrian Football Bundesliga players
Austrian Regionalliga players
Red Arrows F.C. players
SK Sturm Graz players
Zambian expatriate footballers
Zambian expatriate sportspeople in Austria
Expatriate footballers in Austria